Artur Avahimyan  (born 16 January 1997) is a Ukrainian football midfielder of Armenian descent who plays for Oleksandriya.

Career
Avahimyan is a product of the FC Mariupol and FC Shakhtar youth sportive schools.

In February 2017 he went on loan for the Ukrainian First League club FC Illichivets Mariupol. His career continued, when he finished on loan playing and signed in June 2017 a 2 years deal with FC Mariupol (former FC Illichivets), that was promoted to the Ukrainian Premier League.

References

External links
 
 

Ukrainian footballers
Ukrainian expatriate footballers
Association football midfielders
1997 births
Living people
Sportspeople from Mariupol
FC Mariupol players
FC Illichivets-2 Mariupol players
FC Arsenal Kyiv players
FC Alashkert players
FC Chornomorets Odesa players
FC Oleksandriya players
Ukrainian people of Armenian descent
Ukrainian Premier League players
Ukrainian First League players
Ukrainian Second League players
Armenian Premier League players
Ukraine youth international footballers
Ukrainian expatriate sportspeople in Armenia
Expatriate footballers in Armenia